Sahlabad (also Romanized as Sahlābād; also known as Şāleḩābād and Sālihābād) is a village in Mazul Rural District, in the Central District of Nishapur County, Razavi Khorasan Province, Iran. At the 2006 census, its population was 237, in 67 families.

References 

Populated places in Nishapur County